Terre Haute Union Station was a passenger train station located at Ninth Street and Spruce Street, Terre Haute, Indiana, serving riders for nearly 67 years.  It was completed on August 15, 1893, at the cost of $273,000. 

Union Station was designed by Cincinnati architect Samuel Hannaford. The station was a three and a half story structure built in the Romanesque style. Originally, it served the Chicago and Eastern Illinois Railroad and the Terre Haute & Indianapolis Railroad (which was bought by the Pennsylvania Railroad three days after Union Station opened), as it was at the junction of the two lines. The station also served the Chicago, Milwaukee, St. Paul and Pacific Railroad (also known as the ‘Milwaukee Road’). The last Milwaukee Road service was a short line route to Bedford, Indiana to the southeast. The company moved its last service out of the station in the 1930s.

Barbara Carney, a railroad museum administrator, said that Buffalo Bill, Jack Benny, and presidents Benjamin Harrison, William McKinley, Theodore Roosevelt, William Howard Taft, Franklin D. Roosevelt, Harry S. Truman and Richard Nixon all stopped at Union Station at some point.

The station was demolished in the middle of June, 1960, with a crowd of approximately 1,000 observing the event. For two decades in subsequent years, the building’s location was the site of the African American Culture Center at Indiana State University.

Named passenger trains serving Union Station
Chicago and Eastern Illinois Railroad, in 1954, daily departures, except where marked *:
Dixie Flagler* (Chicago - Miami)
Dixie Flyer (Chicago - Jacksonville)
Georgian (Chicago – Atlanta) 
Humming Bird (Chicago – New Orleans) 

Pennsylvania Railroad, in 1953, daily departures:
Allegheny (eastbound only) (St. Louis – New York) 
American  (St. Louis – New York) 
Mail and Express (westbound only) (Pittsburgh – St. Louis)
Penn Texas  (St. Louis – New York)
Spirit of St. Louis  (St. Louis – New York)
St. Louisan (St. Louis – New York)

See also
Terre Haute station (Amtrak)

References

External links
 Cited by WTIU in 'Hometown: A Journey Through Terre Haute, Indiana'

Terre Haute
Chicago and Eastern Illinois Railroad
Former Chicago, Milwaukee, St. Paul and Pacific Railroad stations
Former Pennsylvania Railroad stations
Former railway stations in Indiana
Railway stations in the United States opened in 1893
Railway stations closed in 1960